Sulayman Beg Bijan was a Turkoman military officer from the Bijan clan, who served the Aq Qoyunlu. He was captured and executed in Diyar Bakr in 1492 by the Aq Qoyunlu prince Nur Ali Bayandur in vengeance for the murder of his uncle Qurkhmas.

References

Sources 
 
 

Generals of the Aq Qoyunlu
15th-century births
1492 deaths